Momodou Sabally was the Gambian Secretary General and head of the Civil Service from 10 June 2013 till July 2014. He later became Director General of the Gambia Radio and Television Services (GRTS) until his arrest on November 8, 2016.

Education 
Sabally graduated with a degree in Mathematics from the University of The Gambia February 1999.
.

References 

Gambian politicians